Quintín Vázquez García (born 23 July 1955) is a Mexican politician formerly affiliated with the Institutional Revolutionary Party. As of 2014 he served as Deputy of the LIX Legislature of the Mexican Congress representing Jalisco.

References

1955 births
Living people
Politicians from Guadalajara, Jalisco
Institutional Revolutionary Party politicians
University of Guadalajara alumni
Deputies of the LIX Legislature of Mexico
Members of the Chamber of Deputies (Mexico) for Jalisco